AmeriPride Services is a uniform rental and linen supply company in North America. Operating more than 115 production facilities and service centers throughout the United States and Canada, AmeriPride provides linen, uniforms, floor mats, restroom products and facilities services to nearly 150,000 customers every week. The organization supplies local, regional and national companies in industries including automotive, industrial, oil and gas, manufacturing, healthcare, hospitality, food and beverage, and food processing.

Founded in 1889 by George and Frank Steiner, the company was previously owned and managed by the Steiner family.  On January 22, 2018, Aramark announced that it had completed its acquisition of AmeriPride Services for $1.0 billion. Company information can be found online at www.ameripride.com.

History 
As a young man, George Steiner worked as a towel delivery boy for Johnson's towel route in Lincoln, Nebraska.  When Johnson lost his contract to have his towels laundered by inmates at the state penitentiary in 1889, he offered to sell to George his towel route for $50.80- half down, half later. He purchased the towel business and as his business grew, George turned for help to his younger brother whom he made an equal partner. Together they made deliveries from a green and white hand cart they pushed through the city streets. It wasn't long before the hand cart was upgraded to a horse-drawn wagon. George named his business Lincoln Towel and Apron Supply Company and later became known as American Linen. Business continued to grow and the Lincoln business expanded to Salt Lake City, UT and Minneapolis, Minnesota in the late 1800s and Vancouver, British Columbia in the early 1920s establishing the Canadian Linen Supply Company. Today the American Linen Supply Company is known as AmeriPride and serves over 150,000 customers daily.

Timeline
1889 - Company founded by George and Frank Steiner in Lincoln, Nebraska, United States.
Late 1800s - Expansion and opening of Salt Lake City and Minneapolis branches
1925 - Expansion into Canada with Vancouver branch
1935 - Minneapolis Linen Supply Company’s uniform-manufacturing plant opens 
1948 - Consolidation of 19 branches into one corporation under the American Linen Supply Company
1960s and 1970s - Multiple acquisitions made across the U.S. and Canada
1998 - Company name changes to AmeriPride Services Inc. in the U.S., Canadian Linen and Apparel Services in Canada, and Quebec Linge in the province of Quebec
2007 - Company opens Toronto Central facility 
2009 - Bill Evans appointed as first non-family CEO

References

External links 
 AmeriPride
 Canadian Linen
 Quebec Linge

Business services companies of the United States
Laundry businesses
Business services companies established in 1889
American companies established in 1889
Companies based in Minnetonka, Minnesota
1889 establishments in Nebraska
2018 mergers and acquisitions